William Boswell may refer to:

 William Boswell (died 1650), English politician
 William Boswell (cricketer) (1892–1916), English cricketer